Katerina Vidiaux López (born 9 June 1987 in Holguín) is a Cuban freestyle wrestler. She competed in the freestyle 63 kg event at the 2012 Summer Olympics; after defeating Elif Jale Yeşilırmak in the qualifications, she was eliminated by Lubov Volosova in the 1/8 finals.

References

External links
 

1987 births
Living people
Cuban female sport wrestlers
Olympic wrestlers of Cuba
Wrestlers at the 2012 Summer Olympics
People from Holguín
Pan American Games medalists in wrestling
Pan American Games silver medalists for Cuba
Wrestlers at the 2015 Pan American Games
Medalists at the 2015 Pan American Games
20th-century Cuban women
21st-century Cuban women